From the Westside with Love II is the debut studio album by American rapper Dom Kennedy. The album was released on June 28, 2011. The album features guest appearances from Asher Roth, Mikey Rocks, Polyester, Big K.R.I.T., Casey Veggies and Schoolboy Q.

Track listing

Charts

References

2011 debut albums
Albums produced by Scoop DeVille
Albums produced by DJ Mustard
Sequel albums
West Coast hip hop albums
Dom Kennedy albums
Albums produced by Cardo
Albums produced by Chuck Inglish